Alex Bagiu is a Romanian diver. He competed in two events at the 1980 Summer Olympics.

References

Year of birth missing (living people)
Living people
Romanian male divers
Olympic divers of Romania
Divers at the 1980 Summer Olympics
Place of birth missing (living people)